Persatuan Belia Islam Nasional or PEMBINA, (In English for "National Islamic Youth Association") is a Malaysian Muslim youth organisation based in Kajang with branches in 30 states and 89 campus in Malaysia. PEMBINA was founded in 2006 and is registered under the Registrar Office Youth Societies  under Malaysia Ministry of Youth & Sports. PEMBINA serves as the student society of Ikatan Muslimin Malaysia, with the intention to provide a working platform for its youth members to enhance youth empowerment and activism.

The majority of PEMBINA members are youths and students from local universities, abiding by the Malaysian University and University College Act (AUKU) which allows tertiary students to be members of legal NGOs. PEMBINA has grown into the fourth-largest Muslim youth organisation in Malaysia. PEMBINA aims to generate pious but well-rounded and multi-talented youths able to contribute to the welfare of society and uphold rightful beliefs. The Islamic society’s activities cover a vast spectrum of areas, being dynamic and energetic as youths should be. This includes sports, arts, outdoor camps, hiking and mountain climbing, fashion exhibitions, while also highlighting Islamic knowledge classes, studies, seminars and conventions.

In 2019, PEMBINA organizes the HIMMAH program that attended by almost 1000 youth and university students. The objectives of the program to highlight are the new model of student movement by the focus on the five main agenda which is Muslim identity, Intellectualism, Volunteerism, Graduate Employability and Student Survival.

Previous major events
 Entrepreneurship and financial management seminar
 Muslim Family Convention
 Himpunan Mahasiswa (HIMMAH)
Festival Beliawanis Nasional (FBN)
Anak Muda Bersama Warga Emas (Ageing Society Activities)

References

External links
 

Islamic youth organizations
Youth organisations based in Malaysia
Islamic organisations based in Malaysia
Islamic organizations established in 2006
Youth organizations established in 2006